The 2008–09 OJHL season was the 16th and final season of the Ontario Junior Hockey League (OJHL) before it was divided into two leagues for a single season. The twenty-nine teams of the Phillips, Ruddock, and MacKinnon Divisions will play 49-game schedules, while the eight teams of the Ontario Hockey Association's Central Division Hockey will play an experimental 53-game season.

Come February, the top eight teams of each division will play down for the Frank L. Buckland Trophy, the OJHL championship.  The winner of the Buckland Cup will compete in the Central Canadian Junior "A" championship, the Dudley Hewitt Cup.  If successful against the winners of the Northern Ontario Junior Hockey League and Superior International Junior Hockey League, the champion would then move on to play in the Canadian Junior Hockey League championship, the 2009 Royal Bank Cup.

Changes 
Super Division is approved for 2008-09
Quinte West Pack are now the Trenton Hercs
Bramalea Blues will return for 2008-09 season
Bancroft Hawks have been sold and are now Upper Canada Hockey Club
Durham Fury have moved and become Whitby Fury
Trenton Hercs folded mid-season in January 2009

Current Standings 
as of February 13, 2009

Note: GP = Games played; W = Wins; L = Losses; OTL = Overtime losses; SL = Shootout losses; GF = Goals for; GA = Goals against; PTS = Points; x = clinched playoff berth; y = clinched division title; z = clinched conference title

Please note: (x-) denotes playoff berth, (y-) denotes elimination.

Teams listed on the official league website.

Standings listed by Pointstreak on official league website.

2008-09 Frank L. Buckland Trophy Playoffs

Championship round

Divisional Playoffs

Note: C is Central, M is Mackinnon, P is Phillips, R is Ruddock.

Playoff results are listed by Pointstreak on the official league website.

Dudley Hewitt Cup Championship
Hosted by the Schreiber Diesels in Schreiber, Ontario.  The Kingston Voyageurs finished in first place.

Round Robin
Kingston Voyageurs 9 - Schreiber Diesels (SIJHL) 0
Fort William North Stars (SIJHL) 1 - Kingston Voyageurs 0
Kingston Voyageurs 2 - Soo Thunderbirds (NOJHL) 0
Final
Kingston Voyageurs 4 - Fort William North Stars (SIJHL) 1

2009 Royal Bank Cup Championship
Hosted by the Victoria Grizzlies in Victoria, British Columbia.  The Kingston Voyageurs lost out in the semi-final.

Round Robin
Victoria Grizzlies (BCHL) 5 - Kingston Voyageurs 0
Kingston Voyageurs 7 - Summerside Western Capitals (MJAHL) 5
Humboldt Broncos (SJHL) 5 - Kingston Voyageurs 2
Vernon Vipers (BCHL) 8 - Kingston Voyageurs 5
Semi-final
Vernon Vipers (BCHL) 6 - Kingston Voyageurs 3

Scoring leaders 
Note: GP = Games played; G = Goals; A = Assists; Pts = Points; PIM = Penalty minutes

Leading goaltenders 
Note: GP = Games played; Mins = Minutes played; W = Wins; L = Losses: OTL = Overtime losses; SL = Shootout losses; GA = Goals Allowed; SO = Shutouts; GAA = Goals against average

Players selected in 2009 NHL Entry Draft
Rd 2 #59   Brandon Pirri -	Chicago Blackhawks	(Georgetown Raiders)
Rd 3 #69 	Reilly Smith -	Dallas Stars	(St. Michael's Buzzers)
Rd 6 #169	Dustin Walsh -	Montreal Canadiens	(Kingston Voyageurs)

See also 
 2009 Royal Bank Cup
 Dudley Hewitt Cup
 List of OJHL seasons
 Northern Ontario Junior Hockey League
 Superior International Junior Hockey League
 Greater Ontario Junior Hockey League
 2008 in ice hockey
 2009 in ice hockey

References

External links 
 Official website of the Ontario Junior Hockey League
 Official website of the Canadian Junior Hockey League

Ontario Junior Hockey League seasons
OJHL